Conotton Valley High School is a public high school near Bowerston, Ohio, United States. The building itself is physically located in Orange Township, Carroll County. It is the only high school in the Conotton Valley Union Local School District.  Their nickname is the Rockets.  The Rockets are members of the Ohio Valley Athletic Conference and the Inter Valley Conference.

Notable alumni

 Bob Huggins, (attended, did not graduate), College Basketball Coach

References

External links

School website
Conotton Valley Union Local Schools District website

High schools in Carroll County, Ohio
Public high schools in Ohio